Fallin may refer to:

People with the surname
 Christina Fallin (born 1987), American lobbyist and singer, daughter of former Oklahoma Governor Mary Fallin
 Ken Fallin (born 1948), American illustrator and caricaturist
 Mary Fallin (born 1954), American politician, 27th governor of Oklahoma from 2011 to 2019

Other uses
 Fallin, Stirling, a village in Scotland
 Fallin (album), a 2012 album by Tay Kewei

See also 
 Falling (disambiguation) or the variant spelling Fallin'
 Fallen (disambiguation)
 Fallon (disambiguation)
 Fall in, bugle call, see Assembly